Yvette Kong (born 18 January 1993) is a Hong Kong competitive Olympic swimmer.

She qualified to the 2016 Summer Olympics in Rio de Janeiro, and was selected to represent Hong Kong in the women's 100 metre breaststroke, 200 metre breaststroke, and 4x100 metre medley relay.

Family
Yvette is the cousin of Hong Kong singer Shiga Lin.

References

External links

1993 births
Living people
Hong Kong female breaststroke swimmers
Swimmers at the 2016 Summer Olympics
Olympic swimmers of Hong Kong
Swimmers at the 2010 Asian Games
Swimmers at the 2014 Asian Games
Swimmers at the 2018 Asian Games
Asian Games bronze medalists for Hong Kong
Asian Games medalists in swimming
Medalists at the 2014 Asian Games
Canadian emigrants to Hong Kong
California Golden Bears women's swimmers
Competitors at the 2013 Summer Universiade
Competitors at the 2015 Summer Universiade
21st-century Hong Kong women